Vismia mandurr, the mancharropa or puntelanza, is a species of flowering plant in the family Hypericaceae, native to Colombia, Ecuador, and Peru. It is fed upon by Colombian woolly monkeys (Lagothrix lagothricha lugens).

References

mandurr
Flora of Colombia
Flora of Ecuador
Flora of Peru
Plants described in 1895